The 2015 Kenyan Super Cup was a Kenyan football match contested by the 2014 Kenyan Premier League champions Gor Mahia and the 2014 FKF President's Cup champions Sofapaka. Gor Mahia won the match 2–1 after 90 minutes. The winners claimed KSh.750,000/= in prize money while Sofapaka collected KSh.500,000/= as runners-up.

Road to the Cup

2014 Kenyan Premier League standings

2014 FKF President's Cup bracket

Match details

FKF response

Following previous threats from the Football Kenya Federation (FKF) to impose sanctions on any official who would take part in the match, an official from Kenyan football's governing body announced that Gor Mahia and Sofapaka would be fined a total of KSh.200,000/= each for participating in a match not sanctioned by the FKF and added that the teams would face further disciplinary action if they continued to defy them. Match referee Moses Osano, linesmen Dorcas Wanza and Stephen Oduor, fourth official Amos Wanjala and match commissioner Paul Kaunda were all also handed three-month bans by the FKF for participating in the match.

References

Super Cup
2015
February 2015 sports events in Africa